The Eagle River is a tributary of the Colorado River, approximately  long, in west central Colorado in the United States.

It rises in southeastern Eagle County, at the continental divide, and flows northwest past Gilman, Minturn, Avon. Near Wolcott, it turns west, flowing past Eagle and Gypsum, and joins the Colorado at Dotsero, in western Eagle County.

Acid mine drainage from the abandoned Eagle Mine has entered the river.

See also
 List of rivers of Colorado
 List of tributaries of the Colorado River

References

Rivers of Eagle County, Colorado
Rivers of Colorado
Tributaries of the Colorado River in Colorado